Ball Park Music are an Australian five-piece indie rock band from Brisbane, who formed in 2008. The band consists of Sam Cromack, Jennifer Boyce, Paul Furness, Dean Hanson and Daniel Hanson. Their debut studio album Happiness and Surrounding Suburbs was released in 2011 and was nominated for Australian Album of the Year at the J Awards, peaking at number 36 on the ARIA Albums Chart. In 2012, the band released Museum, followed by Puddinghead, their third studio album in 2014, which peaked at number two. It spawned the certified platinum single "She Only Loves Me When I'm There", becoming the band's first song to chart on the ARIA Singles chart.

Their sixth studio album Ball Park Music was released in 2020, spawning the single "Cherub" which polled at number four in the Triple J Hottest 100 of 2020. The album was nominated for multiple awards and won Album of the Year at the Queensland Music Awards. Weirder & Weirder (2022) is the band's most recent album, nominated for Best Independent Album and Best Rock Album at the 2022 ARIA Awards. Preceding single "Stars In My Eyes" polled at number eight in the Hottest 100 of 2022.

Career

Formation and early years
Ball Park Music was originally the name given to Sam Cromack's solo work. The band all met while they were studying music together at the Queensland University of Technology.

Ball Park Music independently released their debut EP Rolling on the Floor, Laughing Ourselves to Sleep in April 2009. The EP was quickly championed by Triple J presenter Steph Hughes who gave an early version of "All I Want Is You" and "Black Skies" their first national airplay. Richard Kingsmill said "Rufus Wainwright called. He wants his song back. So he should. This is a pretty good one" about their song "Black Skies" and gave it four out of five stars.

2010: Conquer the Town, Easy as Cake and "iFly"
In 2010, Ball Park Music released their second EP Conquer the Town, Easy as Cake. The EP spawned their first Triple J hit in "iFly" which immediately was added to high rotation and gained a five star rating from Richard Kingsmill. Another song, "Western Whirl", was nominated for both Best Alternative and The Courier-Mail People's Choice Awards at the 2010 Q Song Awards.

In October 2010, the band embarked on their first Australian tour in October with Hungry Kids of Hungary and Big Scary and released a brand new single "Sad Rude Future Dude" which was placed on rotation by Triple J.

In November 2010, they were named as a Triple J New Crop artist – "one of the 20 best new bands in Australia" – and was also offered a slot at the Triple J Ausmusic Month Party in Brisbane where they collaborated with Custard's David McCormack on a cover of Custard's hit song "Apartment". Following this, the band was announced as the Queensland winner of a Triple J Unearthed competition and won the chance to play at Big Day Out 2011 on the Gold Coast. Additionally, the band played several festivals in summer of 2010/11 including Falls Festival, South Bound, Sunset Sounds and Good Vibrations.

2011: Happiness and Surrounding Suburbs 

In June 2011, Ball Park Music released "Rich People Are Stupid" which was put on high rotation on Triple J. On 24 June 2011, Ball Park Music signed to Sydney label Stop Start Music to release their debut album. "It's Nice to Be Alive" was released in July 2011 and was once again supported by Triple J. The video for the song achieved a Channel [V] Ripe Clip of the Week, beating out competition from The Kooks' "Junk of the Heart" and Kanye West & Jay-Z's "Otis". "It's Nice to Be Alive" was featured in the film Blended (2014) and the fifth season of Gossip Girl. The track reached certified platinum status in Australia in 2021.

The band's debut studio album Happiness and Surrounding Suburbs was released in Australia and New Zealand on 9 September and debuted on the Australian ARIA Album Chart the following week at No. 36. Ball Park Music embarked on a four-date headline tour with Adelaide rock outfit City Riots on the How I Met Ball Park Music Tour which was followed by another headline tour to launch their debut album in October with Northeast Party House and The Jungle Giants. Immediately following that, they embarked as main support for Boy & Bear on their "Moonfire Tour".

In November, Ball Park Music were named the Unearthed Artist of the Year at Triple J's J Awards. They were also nominated for the 2011 J Award but were beaten by Gotye and his album Making Mirrors.

In December it was announced that Happiness and Surrounding Suburbs was voted No. 10 in Triple J's Top 10 Albums of 2014 and No. 2 in The AU Reviews album poll. The third single, "Literally Baby", was serviced to radio and TV, and it quickly achieved rotation on Nova Brisbane and Channel [V]. To finish off the year, the band played Peats Ridge Festival, Pyramid Rock and No Years on New Year's Eve in Brisbane.

2012: Museum 

Ball Park Music began 2012 by announcing The 180° Tour; "their most ambitious tour yet". They were initially to play 14 dates with supports Nantes and Cub Scouts but added more shows in Brisbane, Sydney, Adelaide and Melbourne due to popular demand. The band was also added to the 2012 Groovin' the Moo line-up as well as Splendour in the Grass.

On 23 March 2012, Ball Park Music were invited to do Triple J's Like a Version, where they performed their single "All I Want Is You" followed by a cover of the Flaming Lips song "Do You Realize??". This was also filmed for Triple J TV at the time.

On 20 July 2012, it was announced that the band would release new music in the form of a single called "Surrender" leading into their set at Splendour in the Grass. In a radio interview on Triple J with Zan Rowe, Cromack revealed that band were working on a new album, and they'd be releasing something "soon enough".

Museum was released in Australia on 5 October 2012 and it was named Triple J's Feature Album the following week. The album peaked at number 9 on the ARIA charts.

2013–2014: Puddinghead 

On 14 February 2014, the band issued the lead single to their third studio album. "She Only Loves Me When I'm There" debuted at number 70 on the ARIA Singles Chart and reached certified platinum status in 2021. Second single "Trippin' the Light Fantastic" was released in May 2014. Ball Park Music's first self-produced album, Puddinghead was released on 4 April 2014. It peaked at number 2 on the ARIA Albums Chart, and was nominated for Best Rock Album at the 2014 ARIA Awards. At the 2014 J Awards, the record was nominated for Australian Album of the Year.

2015–2016: Every Night the Same Dream 

Following a brief hiatus and "some hurdles writing this record", the band's fourth studio album, Every Night the Same Dream, was released on 19 August 2016. It was preceded by seven-minute single "Pariah" and "Nihilist Party Anthem". The album, which sonically takes on a more psychedelic rock sound, was met with acclaim. It debuted at number 3 on the ARIA Albums Chart.

2017–2018: Good Mood 

In September 2017, Ball Park Music released "Exactly How You Are", the lead single to their fifth studio album. The song would later poll at number 18 in the Hottest 100 of 2017, and reach certified platinum status in Australia in 2021. "The Perfect Life Does Not Exist" was released in December 2017 as the second single. Good Mood was released on 16 February 2018, supported by a national tour in February and March with Ali Barter and Hatchie. "Hands Off My Body" was added to the official NBA 2K19 soundtrack, curated by Travis Scott. The album was nominated in three categories at the ARIA Music Awards of 2018 – Producer of the Year, Engineer of the Year and Best Cover Art.

2019–2020: Ball Park Music 

The band's sixth album was announced with the title of Mostly Sunny in March 2020, alongside the release of single "Spark Up!". The following month, the band announced they were changing the title of the upcoming album to Ball Park Music. A scheduled tour was cancelled due to the COVID-19 pandemic in Australia, although the release of the self-titled album in October 2020 was followed by a concert residency at a venue in Brisbane. The album included the track "Cherub", which was considered a strong contender to reach #1 in the lead-up to the Triple J Hottest 100, 2020. It placed on the list at #4, beating their previous best, "Exactly How You Are", from 2017.

2021–2022: Weirder & Weirder 

On 26 October 2021, the band released single "Sunscreen". It later polled at number 21 on Triple J's Hottest 100 of 2021. The band's seventh studio album was announced on 14 February 2022 with the title of Weirder & Weirder, originally set for release on 3 June 2022, however, it was pushed forward a week to 27 May 2022. The announcement came with dates for a new Australian tour. The album's second single "Stars In My Eyes" was released on 24 February. The song has been favoured by various publications to win the Hottest 100 of 2022. The third single, "Manny" was released on 6 May.

The band performed live in Sydney for the ABC's New Years' Eve concert on 31 December 2022. They performed originals "Stars In My Eyes", "Trippin' the Light Fantastic" and "It's Nice to Be Alive", as well as "The Real Thing" by Russell Morris and "Even When I'm Sleeping" by Leonardo's Bride.

Band members
 Sam Cromack – lead vocals, lead guitar (2008–present)
 Jennifer Boyce – bass guitar, backing vocals (2008–present)
 Paul Furness – keyboards, trombone (2008–present)
 Dean Hanson – rhythm guitar, bass guitar, backing vocals (2008–present)
 Daniel Hanson – drums, backing vocals (2008–present)

Former members
 Brock Smith – lead and rhythm guitar (2008–2011)

Other projects
Sam Cromack records his solo work under the moniker My Own Pet Radio and has released three solo albums, Suburban Lemon Shops and the Bruxer in My Bed (2009), Unidentified Flying Collection of Songs (2010) and Goodlum (2015).

Jennifer Boyce records solo work under the moniker Little Planes Land.

Discography

 Happiness and Surrounding Suburbs (2011)
 Museum (2012)
 Puddinghead (2014)
 Every Night the Same Dream (2016)
 Good Mood (2018)
 Ball Park Music (2020)
 Weirder & Weirder (2022)

Awards and nominations

AIR Awards
The Australian Independent Record Awards (known colloquially as the AIR Awards) is an annual awards night to recognise, promote and celebrate the success of Australia's independent music sector.

! 
|-
! scope="row"| 2012
| Themselves 
| Best Independent Artist
| 
| 
|-
! scope="row"| 2021
| Ball Park Music
| Independent Album of the Year
| 
| 
|}

APRA Awards
The APRA Awards are presented annually from 1982 by the Australasian Performing Right Association (APRA), "honouring composers and songwriters".

! 
|-
| 2019 
| "Exactly How You Are" (Sam Cromack)
| Song of the Year
| 
| 
|-

ARIA Music Awards
The ARIA Music Awards is an annual ceremony presented by Australian Recording Industry Association (ARIA), which recognise excellence, innovation, and achievement across all genres of the music of Australia. They commenced in 1987.

! 
|-
| 2014 || Puddinghead || ARIA Award for Best Rock Album||  || rowspan="2"| 
|-
| 2016 || Every Night the Same Dream || Best Rock Album ||  
|-
| rowspan="3"| 2021|| rowspan="2"| Ball Park Music || ARIA Award for Best Independent Release || 
| rowspan="3"| 
|-
| Best Rock Album || 
|-
| Ball Park Music - The Residency || ARIA Award for Best Australian Live Act || 
|-
| rowspan="3"| 2022 || rowspan="2"| Weirder & Weirder || Best Independent Release ||  || rowspan="3"| 
|-
| Best Rock Album ||  
|-
| Paul McKercher for Ball Park Music – Weirder & Weirder || Mix Engineer – Best Mixed Album ||

J Awards
The J Awards are an annual series of Australian music awards that were established by the Australian Broadcasting Corporation's youth-focused radio station Triple J. They commenced in 2005.

! 
|-
! scope="row" rowspan="2"| 2011
| Happiness and Surrounding Suburbs
| Australian Album of the Year
| 
| rowspan="2"| 
|-
| Themselves
| Unearthed Artist of the Year
| 
|-
! scope="row"| 2014
| Puddinghead
| Australian Album of the Year
| 
| 
|-
! scope="row"| 2020
| Ball Park Music
| Australian Album of the Year
| 
| 
|}

National Live Music Awards
The National Live Music Awards (NLMAs) are a broad recognition of Australia's diverse live industry, celebrating the success of the Australian live scene. The awards commenced in 2016.

! 
|-
! scope="row"| 2018
| Themselves
| Best Live Act of the Year – People's Choice
| 
| 
|-
! scope="row"| 2020
| Themselves
| Live Act of the Year
| 
| 
|}

Queensland Music Awards
The Queensland Music Awards (previously known as the Q Song Awards) are an annual awards ceremony celebrating Queensland's brightest emerging artists and established legends. They commenced in 2006.

! 
|-
! scope="row" rowspan="2"| 2013
| rowspan="2"| "Surrender"
| Song of the Year
| 
| rowspan="2"| 
|-
| Pop Song of the Year
| 
|-
! scope="row"| 2021
| Ball Park Music
| Album of the Year
| 
| 
|}

Rolling Stone Australia Awards
The Rolling Stone Australia Awards are awarded annually in January or February by the Australian edition of Rolling Stone magazine for outstanding contributions to popular culture in the previous year.

! 
|-
| 2021
| Ball Park Music
| Rolling Stone Reader's Award
| 
| 
|-

Triple J Hottest 100 and 200 Performance 
The Triple J Hottest 100 is an annual music listener poll hosted by the publicly-funded, national Australian youth radio station, Triple J. Ball Park Music have been featured in almost every countdown since 2011. Their best performance was in the 2020 countdown, with "Cherub" featured at number four. 

Bold indicates a track polled in the top 100.

Concert tours

Headlining
 How I Met Ball Park Music Tour (2011)
 Happiness and Surrounding Suburbs Tour (2011)
 180° Tour (2012)
 Museum Tour (2012)
 Thank Ewes Tour (2013)
 All I Want Is USA • UK • Europe Tour (2013)
 Puddinghead Tour (2014)
 Trippin' the Light Fantastic Tour (2014)
 Every Night The Same Dream Tour (2016)
 Exactly How You Are Tour (2018)
 The Good Good Mood Tour (2019)
 The Residency (2020)
Joint tours
 The Triple Rainbow Tour (2011) (with Eagle & The Worm & We Say Bamboulee)
 Super Commuter Tour (2011) (with Guineafowl)
 Australian Tour (2018) <small> (with San Cisco)

Opening act
 Hungry Kids of Hungary's Escapades Tour (2010) (with Big Scary)
 Boy & Bear's Moonfire Tour (2011)
 Weezer's Australian Tour (2013) (with Cloud Control)

References

Further reading
 Ball Park Music at J Play

External links
 

2008 establishments in Australia
Australian indie pop groups
Australian indie rock groups
Musical groups established in 2008
Musical groups from Brisbane
Musical quintets